The 2020 Vuelta a Guatemala was a road cycling stage race that took place in Guatemala between 23 October and 1 November 2020. The race was rated as a 2.2 event as part of the 2020 UCI America Tour, and was the 60th edition of the Vuelta a Guatemala.

Teams
Two UCI Continental teams, one national team, and eleven domestic teams make up the fourteen teams that participated in the race. Only three of those teams did not enter the maximum of six riders; ASO Quetzaltenalgo-C.Castelli, and Decorabaños each entered five. This meant that 81 riders started the race, of which 61 finished.

UCI Continental Teams

 
 

National Teams

 Panama

Domestic Teams

  A.C. Chimaltenango-Comayma-Linaflor
  ASO Quetzaltenalgo-C.Castelli
  ASO Quiche-India Quiche
  ASO San Marcos-Acredicom
  ASO Solola-Intercop
  Decorabaños
  Dicafriem
  Ejercito de Guatemala
  Hino-One-La Red-Tigo-Eurobikes
  Ópticas Deluxe-Ninosport
  Team France Défense

Route

Stages

Stage 1 
23 October 2020 — Chiquimula to Guastatoya,

Stage 2 
24 October 2020 — Jalapa to Barbarena,

Stage 3 
25 October 2020 — Guatemala City to Coatepeque,

Stage 4 
26 October 2020 — Champerico to Retalhuleu,  (ITT)

Stage 5 
27 October 2020 — Suchitepéquez to Cerro El Baúl,

Stage 6 
28 October 2020 — Totonicapán to Esquipulas Palo Gordo,

Stage 7 
29 October 2020 — Tejutla to Santa Catarina Ixtahuacan,

Stage 8 
30 October 2020 — San Pablo La Laguna to Iximche Ruins,

Stage 9 
31 October 2020 — Santa Apolonia to Aldea Chuchucá Alto,

Stage 10 
1 November 2020 — Guatemala City to Guatemala City,

Classification leadership table

Final classification standings

General classification

Points classification

Mountains classification

Sprints classification

Young rider classification

Guatemalan rider classification

Team classification

References 

2020
2020 UCI America Tour
2020 in Guatemalan sport
October 2020 sports events in North America
November 2020 sports events in North America